Heterocondylus is a genus of Latin American flowering plants in the family Asteraceae.

 Species
 Heterocondylus alatus (Vell.) R.M.King & H.Rob. - Brazil
 Heterocondylus amphidyctius (DC.) R.M.King & H.Rob. - Brazil
 Heterocondylus caracaensis H.Rob. - Brazil
 Heterocondylus decipiens (Baker) R.M.King & H.Rob. - Brazil
 Heterocondylus grandis (Sch.Bip. ex Baker) R.M.King & H.Rob. - Brazil
 Heterocondylus itacolumiensis (Sch.Bip. ex Baker) R.M.King & H.Rob. - Brazil
 Heterocondylus jaraguensis (B.L.Rob.) R.M.King & H.Rob. - Brazil
 Heterocondylus leptolepis (Baker) R.M.King & H.Rob. - Brazil
 Heterocondylus lysimachioides (Chodat) R.M.King & H.Rob. - Paraguay
 Heterocondylus pandurifolius (Baker) R.M.King & H.Rob. - Brazil
 Heterocondylus pumilus (Gardner) R.M.King & H.Rob. - Brazil
 Heterocondylus reitzii R.M.King & H.Rob. - Brazil
 Heterocondylus vitalbae (DC.) R.M.King & H.Rob. - widespread from Costa Rica to Paraguay

References

Asteraceae genera
Eupatorieae